Abraham Lévy-Cohen (1844–1888) was a Moroccan lawyer, businessman, and journalist. He founded Le Reveil du Maroc in 1883, the first francophone newspaper in Morocco.

Biography 
Abraham Lévy-Cohen was born to a Jewish family in Tangier in 1844 and raised in Essaouira (Mogador). He was educated in England and became a naturalized British citizen. He also spent eight years in France. He returned to Morocco and worked as a lawyer, a businessman, and a journalist, in addition to serving as a member of the Tangier regional committee of the Alliance Israélite Universelle, a member of the Freemasons, and a representative of the Anglo-Jewish Association in Tangier. He also served as a correspondent for Jewish newspapers based in London, such as The Jewish Chronicle and The Jewish World. Although he was a naturalized subject of the British crown, he was a member of the Francophilic Jewish elite of Morocco, and worked to further French culture and interests in Morocco.

On July 14, 1883, he began publishing the first francophone newspaper in Morocco: Le Reveil du Maroc.

See also
 Haim Benchimol

References 

19th-century Moroccan Jews
Newspaper people
Naturalised citizens of the United Kingdom
1844 births
1888 deaths
People from Tangier
Newspaper publishers (people)